Connor Rennie (born 1 April 1991) is a Scottish football defender who plays for Inverurie Loco Works in the Highland League.

Career

Dundee
Rennie who was a youth player for Inverness Caledonian Thistle was born in Aberdeen. He transferred to Dundee in 2009 and in September 2010 having yet to make a first team appearance he joined Deveronvale on loan.

On his return with Dundee in administration and relying on youth he made his first team debut as a substitute in Dundee's 2-2 draw against Falkirk in the Scottish First Division on 19 March 2011. With his first start coming on 2 April against Raith Rovers at Stark's Park. In all he made six appearances during his debut season, signing a new one-year contract extension in May 2011.

Career statistics

References

1991 births
Living people
Footballers from Aberdeen
Scottish footballers
Association football defenders
Scottish Football League players
Inverness Caledonian Thistle F.C. players
Dundee F.C. players
Deveronvale F.C. players
Inverurie Loco Works F.C. players